Edward Lewis Davison (1898–1970) was a Scottish poet and critic, born in Glasgow, who later moved to the United States.

Davison grew up in Newcastle upon Tyne. In 1914 he joined the navy, where he rose to lieutenant. After the end of World War I he matriculated at St John's College, Cambridge on a scholarship; it was while at Cambridge that he edited an anthology of student poetry and met the writer J. B. Priestley, who would remain a lifelong friend. Davison emigrated to the United States in 1925, and became an academic, teaching at Vassar College, the University of Miami, and the University of Colorado at Boulder, where he was involved in the Colorado Writers 1937 conference. He was a friend of Robert Frost.

The poet Peter Davison is his son.

He was widely published as a poet in the 1920s, featured in the J. C. Squire anthologies, and became known as a writer of sonnets.
His Be Thou At Peace has been set to music by John Raynor.

Military career
Davison joined the United States Army in 1943, shortly after becoming a Naturalized citizen of the United States.  He had previously served as a paymaster in the Royal Navy. During World War II, Davison attained the rank of Lieutenant colonel in the United States Army.  He was named director of the Special Projects Division, which was responsible for overseeing the re-education of German prisoners of war.  Many of Davidson's poems from this time-frame appear to express doubts about the mission he had been assigned.  Davidson had no knowledge of German language, culture, or politics, and so struggled to craft a suitable program.

Works
 Cambridge Poets 1914-1920: an Anthology (1920); BiblioBazaar, 2009, 
 Some Modern Poets And Other Critical Essays Richard West, 1928, 
 Collected Poems 1917-1939 Harper & Brothers, 1940
 Poems G. Bell, 1920
 Harvest of Youth Harper & brothers, 1926
 The Ninth Witch (1932).

Anthologies
The best poems of 1922-, Thomas Moult, Brace & co., 1923
 Poems by Four Authors (1923) with J. R. Ackerley, A. Y. Campbell, and Frank Kendon

See also
Der Ruf (newspaper)

References

External links
 
 Edward Davison Papers. Yale Collection of American Literature, Beinecke Rare Book and Manuscript Library.

1898 births
1970 deaths
Alumni of St John's College, Cambridge
Scottish literary critics
20th-century Scottish poets
Scottish male poets
20th-century British male writers